Qendër Tomin is a former municipality in the Dibër County, northeastern Albania. At the 2015 local government reform it became a subdivision of the municipality Dibër. The population at the 2011 census was 7,590.

References

Former municipalities in Dibër County
Administrative units of Dibër (municipality)